Uche Odoputa  is a Nollywood actor and television personality.

Early life
Uche Odoputa is from Orlu, Imo state in the south-eastern part of Nigeria.

Personal life
He has a foundation called The Uche Odoputa Foundation which engages in activities such as; Education for Orphans, health services for the less privileged, and financial support to widows for trading purposes.
In 2007 Mr Uche Odoputa was arrested by The Nigeria Drug Law Enforcement Agency (NDLEA) for drug trafficking and was jailed for two years and three weeks.

References

Living people
Nigerian male film actors
21st-century Nigerian male actors
Year of birth missing (living people)
Nigerian male television actors
Igbo male actors
Nigerian television personalities
Actors from Imo State
Nigerian humanitarians
People from Imo State
Nigerian philanthropists